The Alexander Dennis Enviro500 MMC (sold as the Alexander Dennis Enviro500) is a low-floor, three-axle double-decker bus produced by the British bus manufacturer Alexander Dennis since 2012, replacing the Alexander Dennis Enviro500. The Enviro500 MMC is available powered by either Euro VI diesel or hybrid-electric and later fully-electric powertrains.

Design 

In 2012, Alexander Dennis unveiled a new generation Enviro500 (also known as the Enviro500 MMC) with a new chassis design. The chassis (also known as the Trident E500 Turbo and E50D/E50H) had the longitudinally-mounted engine and gearbox slightly offset to the left. The Cummins ISLe engine was retained, with choices of ZF EcoLife and Voith DIWA gearbox. Like the Enviro400 with straight staircase, the shape of fuel tank was specifically adopted to be mounted under the staircase. All the axles utilised were supplied by ZF instead of Dana.

The bodywork was also redesigned, with a more angular front-end design based on the Hong Kong version of the Enviro400. It has a new design of staircase known by Alexander Dennis as the "Square-Case", whose size was similar to that of the spiral staircase but with all steps being rectangular shaped.

A hybrid-electric version of this bus model with a Cummins ISBe engine and the BAE Systems HybriDrive series hybrid system had been built in small numbers.

New bodywork 
Later in 2014, Alexander Dennis unveiled the second generation Enviro500 MMC in North America, with a new design of bodywork similar with the Enviro400 MMC launched earlier that year, featuring rounded top edges and a vertically oriented headlamp cluster. This bodywork design was also adopted by the Enviro500s built for Hong Kong since 2015.

Alexander Dennis announced the launch of the Enviro500EV battery electric bus in 2021, initially launched for the North American market as the Enviro500EV CHARGE. The Enviro500EV, seating 130 passengers and sharing components with the 2-axle Enviro400FCEV developed for the UK market, is equipped with a 648 kWh battery and will feature a refreshed exterior design in line with both the UK market's Enviro400EV and Enviro100EV buses.

Orders

Asia and Oceania

Hong Kong 

Citybus

Citybus ordered one new generation Enviro500 in 2011 - 8320 (in conjunction with the 115 older Enviro500), soon followed by further order of 155. 107 of these were for the 12-metre-long version, including 66 fitted with airport coach specifications (8000-8065) while the rest were standard passenger buses (8321-8360). The other 49 were 11.3-metres-long (9100-9148). The first 4 airport coaches entered service in March 2013 and in 2014. Citybus ordered a further 104 new generation Enviro500s which were all the  version and possess a high seating capacity for 90 passengers, 8361 to 8399 and 8402 to 8466.-->In mid 2014, Citybus received a  Enviro500 demonstrator, 6300, and became the second operator in Hong Kong after KMB to receive such a model. Later that year, the operator received 2 hybrid versions of the Enviro500, 8400 and 8401, becoming the third operator of such a type in Hong Kong.

Kowloon Motor Bus

Kowloon Motor Bus ordered 329 new generation Enviro500 in 2012, with the first bus exhibited at the Euro Bus Expo 2012 at the National Exhibition Centre, Birmingham and delivered in February 2013.

Placement of subsequent orders increased the total to over 2200, including 1652 12-metre Euro V version (ATENU), 222 12.8-metre Euro V version (3ATENU), two 12-metre Euro VI version (E6T), 301 12.8-metre Euro VI version (E6X), and 101 11.3-metre Euro VI version (E6M).

Kowloon Motor Bus were the first bus operator in Hong Kong to order the battery electric Enviro500EV, ordering a batch of ten buses for delivery in 2023. When completed, these will be the first zero emissions Alexander Dennis buses developed for the Asia-Pacific market.

4 ATENUs had retired prematurely due to fire. On 4 May 2018, ATENU274 (SP9007) caught on fire while travelling on Tate's Cairn Highway as route 277X and on 11 May 2019, ATENU53 (SD6028) caught on fire while travelling on Connaught Road Central as route 961. On 5 January 2020, ATENU129 (SH963) caught on fire while it was parked in Yuen Long Depot and on 12 October 2020, ATENU280 (SR9793) caught on fire while travelling on Tate's Cairn Highway as route 673. All had received damage beyond repair.

1 ATENU had retired prematurely due to traffic accident. On 18 December 2019, ATENU341 (TA6723) was crashed while travelling on Fanling Highway as route 978.  1 E6X had retired prematurely due to traffic accident. On 5 October 2022, E6X113 (WU9784) was crashed while travelling on Tuen Mun Highway as route 63X.

Hybrid buses

In 2014, KMB received three hybrid version Enviro500 (ATH1-ATH3) as the first hybrid electric double-deckers received by the company.

Long Win Bus

Long Win Bus ordered 22 new generation Enviro500 in 2012, with a further 19 buses diverted from KMB order and follow by another 6 buses. In 2014, LWB placed a further order of 26 new generation Enviro500 with airport coach specification. A further batch of 91 was ordered in 2015 including 40 12-metre buses and 51 12.8-metre and another batch of 62 more was ordered in 2016 with 50 12-metre buses and 12 12.8-metre.

Due to a surplus in Long Win's fleet, 16 of the first batch of buses have been transferred to KMB in 2020.

MTR Bus

MTR Bus ordered 6 11.3-metre-long new generation Enviro500 in 2012, which were delivered and entered service in 2013. Before the 6 new generation Enviro500 were registered, MTR ordered more 28 11.3-metre-long new generation Enviro500 which were delivered and entered service in 2014 and 2015. Then 8 more delivered and entered service in 2017 and 2018.

MTR Bus have ordered a number of battery electric Enviro500EVs, the second Hong Kong operator to do so, which are to be delivered in 2023.

On 5 May 2020, bus 543 caught on fire while travelling on Tuen Mun Road. Due to extensive damage the bus was scrapped immediately after the fire was extinguished.

New World First Bus

New World First Bus ordered 12 new generation Enviro500 in 2013, they are all 11.3-metre-long version. The buses (4040 - 4051) were in service between 2013 and 2014.

In 2014, NWFB ordered another 87 Enviro500 (5583 - 5669), all of them were 12-metre-long version. One hybrid-powered Enviro500 (fleet no. 5600) was also received in the same year, becoming the second operator receiving hybrid version.

In 2016, NWFB received further 50 more 12-metre-long Enviro500 (5670 - 5719) followed by 76 more 12.8-metre-long Enviro500 (6100 - 6175) and another 40 more 11.3-metre-long version (4052 - 4091) in 2017, but with restyled front and rear.

In 2017, NWFB received 30 second-hand 12-metre-long Enviro500s from Citybus, with new fleet numbers from 5720 to 5749 (originally 8361 to 8390). It also received 22 12.8-metre-long Enviro500 (6176 - 6197) between 2017 and 2018.

In 2018, NWFB received further 90 12-metre-long Enviro500s (5750-5839) and 12 12.8-metre-long Enviro500(6198-6209) with Euro VI engine.

A further 12 (Fleet numbers 5840–5851) were transferred from Citybus (Original Fleet Numbers 8525–8536) in 2020.

CLP Group

CLP Group ordered one Enviro500 to replace one old version Enviro500 written off after an accident. It was delivered in late 2015.

Singapore 

SMRT Buses

SMRT Buses initially ordered 103 Enviro500 double deckers for delivery in 2014 but the order was expanded to 201 in total, with an additional 98 buses to be used for Land Transport Authority (LTA)'s Bus Service Enhancement Programme (BSEP). As of Sunday 13 July 2014, the first double deckers started service on the route of 972.

Bus Contracting Model (BCM)

As part of the Bus Contracting Model, some of the Enviro500s were transferred to Tower Transit Singapore under the Bulim bus package in May 2016.Some of these buses were repainted into the lush green livery. More units of Enviro500s were transferred to Tower Transit under the Sembawang-Yishun Bus Package in September and October 2021.

A mock-up of restyled  Enviro500 MMC concept bus with 3 doors and 2 staircases was also built for the Land Transport Authority.

On 25 April 2019, the Land Transport Authority announced that they had awarded the tender to Alexander Dennis (Singapore) Services Pte. Ltd to procure 50 units of three-door Enviro500s after successful trials of the 3 door concept bus.

On 26 October 2021, the first three-door Enviro 500s of the batch of 50 entered service on SBS Transit Service 974 and SMRT Buses Service 190. These buses are fitted with Mercedes-Benz OM936LA engines instead of the Cummins engines found on earlier batches of Enviro 500s, and are built to a fully low-floor design, in comparison to the earlier MAN double-deckers. During their service debut, all three buses experienced various mechanical issues, including engines overheating and issues with air pressure and centre doors.

Malaysia 

In Malaysia, Prasarana Malaysia ordered 40 Euro III-engined Enviro500 buses for Rapid KL's Rapid Bus service. The buses serve high capacity routes around the Klang Valley, especially from Cheras and Shah Alam to the capital city of Kuala Lumpur as well as the inner routes in the city centre. A further three Enviro500s entered service on Penang's Rapid Bus routes in August 2016, before they were transferred to Rapid KL following unsatisfactory results. They were reintroduced to Rapid Penang in February 2022

New Zealand 
New Zealand operators began purchasing Enviro 500s in 2015, the following operators have purchased the type:

 Howick & Eastern: 19
 NZ Bus: Auckland - 23 (2016) x 54 (2018) Wellington x 17 (2018, delayed entry into service until 2019)
 Birkenhead Transport: 8
 Ritchies Transport Holdings x 23 (1356-1369 AT NEX livery. 1370-1378 AT Metro livery).
 Mana Coach Services (Under Newlands branding) x 6 (2018)

Some were assembled locally by Kiwi Bus Builders.

North America

United States 

Enviro500 MMCs produced in the United States are made under the title of 'USA Standard' instead of MMC. Production of these models has taken place since September 2014 in a newly opened facility originally owned by Ameritrans Bus, Inc. in Nappanee, Indiana. By December 2016, Alexander Dennis took over all manufacturing operations within the facility and added a second body assembly line to increase production.

As for operators, Community Transit in Snohomish County, Washington currently has a fleet of 62 Enviro500 coaches, including 39 Enviro500 'USA Standard' coaches. After its initial order of 23 Enviro500 coaches proved to be well suited for the agencies commuter routes with direct peak-hour service to Downtown Seattle, the agency placed orders for 17 more Enviro500 'USA Standard' coaches in 2013, 5 more in 2014, and 17 more in 2016.

At the same time as Community Transit placed its order, neighboring agency Sound Transit, the regional operator in Seattle, also ordered five Enviro500 'USA Standard' coaches. The agency used the coaches to test their suitability for use Sound Transit Express routes. After proving to be successful, Sound Transit placed an order for an additional 32 Enviro500 'USA Standard' coaches in 2016 which would replace 32 articulated buses loaned from Sound Transit to Community Transit. Another order for 13 buses followed in 2018. The Enviro500s were first introduced on commuter routes between Snohomish County and Seattle, and later expanded service to Bellevue. All are operated by Community Transit.

Kitsap Transit has ordered 11 Enviro500 'USA Standard' coaches to provide higher-capacity on its busiest ferry feeder services after demonstrations in 2013 and 2015.

After a successful pilot in 2015, AC Transit awarded a contract to Alexander Dennis for 10 double-deck buses in 2016; the contract includes options for an additional 19 buses, divided as 10 buses for AC Transit, 3 buses for Unitrans, and 6 buses for WestCAT. Transbay service using Enviro500s began in December 2018.

Foothill Transit ordered 2 Enviro500EV variants with an all-electric drivetrain supplied by Proterra, expected to enter service in 2019. These buses were delivered on 20 January 2021, prior to the formal launch of the Enviro500EV by Alexander Dennis.

Canada 

In 2015, GO Transit, Canada's largest operator of double-deckers with over 120 vehicles in its fleet, became the launch customer for the Super-Lo variant of the Enviro500s. Their lower height of 3.9 metres allows them to fit into terminals with height restrictions, particularly York Mills and Yorkdale Terminals. The first batch of 38 vehicles (8300-8337) was delivered in 2016. The chassis for these vehicles are being manufactured at a purpose-built factory in Vaughan, north of Toronto, creating up to 30 new full-time jobs. As a suburban bus operator, the Enviro500 has single doors at the front.

Strathcona County Transit received five Enviro500 MMCs in 2016. An additional five were ordered in 2017/2018 and entered service in 2019. Two more entered service in early 2020.

OC Transpo ordered 43 new Enviro500 MMC "Go Anywhere" models for delivery starting in late 2015 with the last entering service September 2016. These new buses will also be fitted with Wi-Fi, of which 15 currently have Wi-Fi as a test project. A further 17 buses entered service in 2017, making the current active fleet of over 130 units, with plans for other units pending. OC Transpo's Enviro500 have doors at the front and the middle. 8155 was damaged in a serious collision with a Westboro transit station shelter.

Coast Mountain Bus Company (TransLink) ordered 32 units for 2019/2020 for use on their suburban routes, followed by another 25 buses for 2021. The first units entered service in October 2019.

Mexico 
Metrobús of Mexico City ordered 90 Enviro500 MMCs after evaluating one original version Enviro500 demonstrator in late 2014. They are scheduled for delivery in 2016. The delivery has been delayed and as of 2017 only 22 out of 90 buses have arrived to Mexico City. The service of Metrobus is expected to start in October 2017 with the route that starts from Indios Verdes to Campo Marte.

Europe

Germany 

In October 2015 Berliner Verkehrsbetriebe (BVG), the public transport operator of Germany's capital, commenced a six-week trial of an Alexander Dennis Enviro500, as part of a bigger testing programme for a new series of buses for the city.

In October 2018, the BVG ordered 200 Enviro500 in order to replace the MAN Lion's City DD. The first two were unveiled by BVG in October 2020.

Switzerland 
In September 2015, Alexander Dennis announced the order of 19 Enviro500s with twin staircases and three doors for PostAuto, Switzerland, delivery started in 2017.

References

See also 

 List of buses

Alexander Dennis buses
Double-decker buses
Battery electric buses
Tri-axle buses